The Soyang Dam, also referred to as the Soyanggang Dam, is an embankment dam on the Soyang River,  northeast of Chuncheon in Gangwon-do Province, South Korea. The purpose of the dam is flood control, water supply and hydroelectric power generation. Construction on the dam began in 1967 and was complete in 1973.

See also

List of power stations in South Korea

References

Dams in South Korea
Hydroelectric power stations in South Korea
Embankment dams
Buildings and structures in Gangwon Province, South Korea
Dams completed in 1973